Littorio Sampieri (16 July 1927 – 25 July 1979) was an Italian gymnast. He competed in eight events at the 1952 Summer Olympics.

References

External links
 

1927 births
1979 deaths
Italian male artistic gymnasts
Olympic gymnasts of Italy
Gymnasts at the 1952 Summer Olympics
People from Forlì
Sportspeople from the Province of Forlì-Cesena